Raphael Framberger (born 6 September 1995) is a German footballer who plays as a defender for  club SV Sandhausen on loan from FC Augsburg.

Club career
On 11 January 2023, Framberger joined SV Sandhausen on loan.

Career statistics

References

1995 births
Living people
Sportspeople from Augsburg
Footballers from Bavaria
German footballers
Germany youth international footballers
Association football defenders
FC Augsburg II players
FC Augsburg players
SV Sandhausen players
Bundesliga players
Regionalliga players